Dowar Islet is an island locality in the Torres Strait Island Region, Queensland, Australia. It consists of a single island, Daua Island (also known as Dowar Island) which is one of the Murray Islands group in the Torres Strait.

Dowar Islet's postcode is 4875.

Geography 
There are a few buildings on the island, but it is not developed.

History 
The island was declared a locality on 2 July 2010.

See also
 List of Torres Strait Islands

References 

Torres Strait Island Region
Localities in Queensland